Meechan may refer to:

 Alex Meechan (born 1980), English footballer
 Conor Meechan, Scottish film editor
 Frank Meechan (1929–1976), Scottish footballer
 James Meechan (born 1930), Scottish artist
 Jim Meechan (born 1963), Scottish footballer
 John Meechan (fl. 1933–1934), Scottish footballer
 Kenny Meechan (born 1972), Scottish footballer
 Mark Meechan (born 1987), Scottish YouTuber
 Peter Meechan (composer) (born 1980), British composer and conductor
 Peter Meechan (footballer) (1872–1915), Scottish footballer
 Steven Meechan (born 1991), Scottish footballer
 Tom Meechan (born 1991), English footballer

See also
 Meehan, a similar surname
 Mehigan, a variation of the surname
 McMeekin, a variation of the surname, usually Scottish